Junior Furnace is an unincorporated community in Scioto County, in the U.S. state of Ohio.

History
The community's namesake Junior Furnace was a blast furnace built in 1828; the name was prefixed "Junior" because the property was two years younger than nearby Franklin Furnace.

Notable person
Thomas H. Carter, a United States Senator from Montana, was born at Junior Furnace in 1854.

References

Unincorporated communities in Scioto County, Ohio
Unincorporated communities in Ohio